Lysine N-methyltransferase 2C (KMT2C) also known as myeloid/lymphoid or mixed-lineage leukemia protein 3 (MLL3) is an enzyme that in humans is encoded by the KMT2C gene.

Function 

This gene is a member of the myeloid/lymphoid or mixed-lineage leukemia (MLL) family and encodes a nuclear protein with an AT-hook DNA-binding domain, a DHHC-type zinc finger, six PHD-type zinc fingers, a SET domain, a post-SET domain and a RING-type zinc finger. This protein is a member of the ASC-2/NCOA6 complex (ASCOM), which possesses histone methylation activity and is involved in transcriptional coactivation. Alternate transcriptional splice variants, encoding different isoforms, have been characterized.

Interactions 

MLL3 has been shown to interact with NCOA6 and RBBP5.

Clinical significance
Mutations of the KMT2C gene cause Kleefstra syndrome-2, a neurodevelopmental disorder first described in 2012.

References

Further reading

External links 
 

Transcription factors